Ravenna High School may refer to one of two high schools in the United States:

Ravenna High School (Michigan) in Ravenna, Michigan
Ravenna High School (Ohio) in Ravenna, Ohio